Pseudoprospero  is a genus of bulbous flowering plants in the family Asparagaceae, subfamily Scilloideae (also treated  as the family Hyacinthaceae). The genus has a single species Pseudoprospero firmifolium, which is endemic to South Africa (the  Cape Province, KwaZulu-Natal).

Description 
Pseudoprospero firmifolium grows from an underground bulb whose tunic has dry, paper-like outer layers. The channelled linear leaves are evergreen. The flowers are borne in a loose many-flowered raceme, which usually has a side branch. Individual flowers have white to lilac tepals which are joined at the base and persist into the fruiting stage. The stamens are more-or-less erect, with filaments joined at the base to the tepals and to each other. The seeds are black.

Systematics 
From the 1970s onwards, Franz Speta and co-workers split up the broadly defined genus Scilla, placing many of its species into separate genera. One of these genera was Pseudoprospero,  created by Speta in 1998 for the former Scilla firmifolia. Subsequent studies have confirmed that Pseudoprospero firmifolium is distinct not only from Scilla but from all other genera in the tribe Hyacintheae (or the subfamily Hyacinthoideae for those who accept the family Hyacinthaceae), being placed in its own subtribe.

Subspecies 
Two subspecies are recognised:
 Pseudoprospero firmifolium subsp. firmifolium - Cape Province
 Pseudoprospero firmifolium subsp. natalensis J.C.Manning - KwaZulu-Natal

Chemistry 
Five homoisoflavanones, 3,5-dihydroxy-7,8-dimethoxy-3-(3',4'-dimethoxybenzyl)-4-chromanone, 3,5-dihydroxy-7-methoxy-3-(3',4'-dimethoxybenzyl)-4-chromanone, 3,5-dihydroxy-7,8-dimethoxy-3-(3'-hydroxy-4'-methoxybenzyl)-4-chromanone, 3,5,6-trihydroxy-7-methoxy-3-(3'-hydroxy-4'-methoxybenzyl)-4-chromanone and 3,5,7-trihydroxy-3-(3'-hydroxy-4'methoxybenzyl)-4-chromanone, can be isolated from the dichloromethane extract of the bulbs of P. firmifolium.

Notes

References

Monotypic Asparagaceae genera
Scilloideae
Flora of the Cape Provinces
Flora of KwaZulu-Natal
Endemic flora of South Africa
Taxa named by John Gilbert Baker
Taxa named by Franz Speta